The 1988 U.S. Pro Tennis Championships, also known by its sponsored name Shawmut U.S. Pro Championships, was a men's tennis tournament played on outdoor green clay courts at the Longwood Cricket Club in Chestnut Hill, Massachusetts in the United States. The event was part of the Super Series of the 1988 Nabisco Grand Prix circuit. It was the 61st edition of the tournament and was held from July 4 through July 10, 1988. Eighth-seeded Thomas Muster won the singles title, his second at the event after 1985.

Finals

Singles
 Thomas Muster defeated  Lawson Duncan 6–2, 6–2
 It was Muster's 1st singles title of the year and the 2nd of his career.

Doubles
 Jorge Lozano /  Todd Witsken defeated  Bruno Orešar /  Jaime Yzaga 3–6, 7–5, 6–2

References

External links
 ITF tournament details
 Longwood Cricket Club – list of U.S. Pro Champions

U.S. Pro Tennis Championships
U.S. Pro Championships
U.S. Pro Championships
U.S. Pro Championships
U.S. Pro Championships
Chestnut Hill, Massachusetts
Clay court tennis tournaments
History of Middlesex County, Massachusetts
Sports in Middlesex County, Massachusetts
Tennis tournaments in Massachusetts
Tourist attractions in Middlesex County, Massachusetts